Mackerel by Moonlight is a 1998 political suspense novel by former Massachusetts Governor William Weld.  Mackerel was "a much-discussed bestseller."

References

Bill Weld
1998 American novels
American comedy novels
Novels about elections
Novels set in Massachusetts
American political novels
Novels about politicians